Dr Solomon's Antivirus Toolkit is an antivirus suite which incorporates prevention, detection and repair for Microsoft MS-DOS, Microsoft Windows (up to 98), Novell, SCO Unix, Sun Solaris and OS/2. It was written by Alan Solomon of S&S International.

History

Dr. Solomon's Anti-Virus Toolkit was first created in 1988 and launched commercially in 1991. This move was to rival market leaders Symantec's Norton Anti-Virus and McAfee VirusScan.

Dr. Solomon's won several computer magazine awards and recommendations. Jerry Pournelle recommended it in his column for Byte magazine in 1992, and more recently wrote "Solomon's was unreservedly the best virus service around." In 1993, Dr. Solomon's Anti-Virus Toolkit was awarded the Queens Award for Technological Achievement. At this time the company name was "S&S International". Later it became "Dr. Solomon's Software Ltd." in the UK, with similarly named companies in Germany, the United States and Australia. In 1997, InfoWorld stated that Dr. Solomon’s was “best at detecting viruses”.

After some previous tension between the two software products, on June 9, 1998, McAfee (then known as Network Associates) agreed to acquire Dr. Solomon's Group plc, the leading European manufacturer of antivirus software, for $642 million in stock.

References

External links
 Official web site saved on archive.org

Antivirus software
Windows security software
1988 software